Goro is a fictional character in the Mortal Kombat fighting game franchise by Midway Games and NetherRealm Studios. He debuted as the sub-boss of the original 1992 Mortal Kombat and has also been featured as a sub-boss in the home ports of Mortal Kombat 4 (1997), the 2011 reboot, and Mortal Kombat X (2015). The character is a Shokan, a half-human, half-dragon race distinguished by their four arms and enormous size. Goro begins the series as champion of the eponymous Mortal Kombat tournament, a title he has held for 500 years. He is generally depicted in a villainous role, fighting for Outworld against Earthrealm's warriors.

An iconic figure in the franchise, Goro is regarded as one of the most memorable and difficult bosses in video game history. He has appeared in various media outside of the games.

Character design and gameplay
According to John Tobias, Goro was created when he and Ed Boon discussed bringing "a big brooding character" to the first Mortal Kombat. The original concept of the character was a two-handed humanoid character Rokuro, a member of "a race of demon warriors called Rokuro-kubi (demons of the dark)" wrongly "reputed as savage barbarians", who would join the tournament "to restore the pride and respect of his race". They drew design inspiration from the stop motion adventure films of Ray Harryhausen, especially his depiction of Kali in The Golden Voyage of Sinbad. 

Unlike other characters in the first Mortal Kombat, Goro was not based on a digitized actor but instead on a clay sculpture created by Curt Chiarelli. Tobias, who considers Goro probably his favorite character in the series, recalled: "Goro was originally called Gongoro, but we decided to shorten his name. My original concept sketch had Goro with 3 fingers and a thumb on each hand. Curt Chiarelli wisely changed it to 2 fingers and a thumb." Chiarelli elaborated: "In my experience and opinion, the first cardinal rule of fantasy character design is maintaining the illusion of anatomical and physiological functionality within the framework of a consistent, aesthetic integrity; and the second is that the simpler and cleaner the forms, the more iconic the creature will be. I suggested some minor revisions, like a decrease in the diameter of Goro’s biceps to facilitate easier animation of the arms, as well as make the number of digits on his hands and feet uniform, as is the pattern in all vertebrates." 

After creating it, he used it as a base for a latex model to make a  painted miniature. After recording a video of an actor making motions similar to those Goro would make in the game, Tobias used stop motion animation to move the miniature's body to match the actor's movements frame for frame. According to Boon, the clay sculpture used to animate Goro in the first Mortal Kombat was twisted around and bent so many times that it simply fell apart. In Goro's Deception bio card, when explaining how Goro was animated, Boon mentions a second model for Goro had also been created; this second model was not used for animation and is still in usable condition to this day, and is also currently in Boon's personal possession.

Appearances

Mortal Kombat games
Goro became Grand Champion of the Mortal Kombat tournament after defeating the Great Kung Lao. For 500 years, he remained undefeated and helped Shang Tsung grow ever closer to achieving Shao Kahn's goal of domination over Earthrealm. In his 10th title defense, however, he faced Liu Kang. Making use of Goro's overconfidence after years of being the undefeated warrior, Liu Kang was able to secure victory. Goro disappeared during the tournament's aftermath, and he was believed to be dead. It is theorized that he actually retreated to his kingdom during this time. Goro is succeeded by another member of his race, Kintaro, as Kahn's right-hand man during the events of Mortal Kombat II. The secret level Goro's Lair is unlockable in Mortal Kombat II, although Goro is not present. Goro reappears in Mortal Kombat Trilogy as a playable character as well as in the 2011 game.

Goro would resurface after Kahn's downfall, during the events of Mortal Kombat 4. Despite having the intent to avenge his losses at Liu Kang's hands, Goro began to take an interest in the matters of his own race and joined his fellow Shokans in a war against the Centaurians. Princess Kitana intervened and negotiated a truce and peace accord between the two races. The meeting was interrupted by Kung Lao who desired to challenge his ancestor's killer. The Shaolin monk lashed out with a ceremonial strike of revenge that left Goro's chest scarred. Considering the score settled, the two shook hands. When Shinnok and his legion were defeated and Edenia was free once more, Goro and the Shokan race decided to ally themselves with the Edenians, agreeing to sign a peace treaty with the Centaurs as a condition of their new partnership.

Years later, during the time of Mortal Kombat: Deadly Alliance, the united Edenian and Shokan forces attacked the weakened Shao Kahn's armies. Exhausted from battle, Goro was struck from behind by Noob Saibot. He was mortally wounded, apparently dying from the injury, and Kitana held a royal funeral for the fallen Shokan prince. However, Goro was able to survive, being saved from death by Shao Kahn himself, with the promise of returning the Shokans to their former glory and the banishment of the Centaurs in exchange for his allegiance. Agreeing to these terms, Goro placed his royal seal on a nearby disfigured fallen Shokan (whom Kitana and the Shokan army found and mistook for him, successfully deceiving them while hiding his defection), and resumed his place at Shao Kahn's side. Goro also appears as a boss character in Mortal Kombat: Shaolin Monks, attacking both Liu Kang and Kung Lao.

In Konquest Mode of Mortal Kombat: Armageddon, Goro is confronted in Shao Kahn's fortress by Taven who wishes to kill Quan Chi but must get past Goro in order to do so. Taven eventually defeats Goro, who storms off. In the 2011 game, Goro reprises his role from the first tournaments. Goro is playable in the 2015 Mortal Kombat X as a bonus pre-order character. His absence from the main story mode is answered in the prequel comics: the Shokan did not ally with Mileena or  Kotal Kahn, and thus were shunned by both and forced into being outcasts. He also serves as the last character the player faces before Shinnok in the Classic Ladder mode. By Mortal Kombat 11, Goro is revealed to have been killed. His corpse also appears in his lair.

Other media
Goro had a prominent role in Malibu's Mortal Kombat comic book adaptations and was the first character to have his own three-issue miniseries, entitled Goro: Prince of Pain. Goro's story did not differ greatly from his in-game profiles, being the Mortal Kombat champion and having previously bested the Great Kung Lao. He was also portrayed as an unstoppable force, easily dispatching the Earthrealm warriors alone, and only having a hard time against Raiden. He remained undefeated during the first three issues of the Blood & Thunder series, having lost for the first time in the second issue of Prince of Pain against Zaggot's creation, the Kombatant. In the following Battlewave series, he remained on Earth after his defeat, and, to appease for his failure, started hunting down the Earthrealm warriors; he injured Jax in battle but was unable to defeat Liu Kang. In the fourth issue he had a mini-story at the end ("When Titans Clash") where he returned to Outworld to fight for Shao Kahn, settling a rivalry with Kintaro along the way.

Goro appears as the champion of Mortal Kombat in the first Mortal Kombat movie, in accordance with his original story. In the movie, Goro is portrayed as an evil warrior, steeped in the authoritarian traditions of Outworld and does not look favorably upon humans. After defeating a long series of opponents, including Johnny Cage's friend Art Lean, he is in turn defeated and sent falling off a cliff to his death by Cage. For the film's production, Goro was an animatronic suit (costing over $1 million and requiring over a dozen puppeteers to operate entirely) voiced by Kevin Michael Richardson, with vocal effects also provided by Frank Welker. 

In the novel based on the film, Goro was shown to be a slightly more noble creature. Goro still fell off the cliff to his death, but rather than having this inflicted upon him by Johnny Cage, Goro deliberately dropped himself, explaining that he would rather die than live in disgrace, and that Shokan warriors die in battle.

In the animated film Mortal Kombat: The Journey Begins, Goro confronts his older brother Durak for a jeweled egg in which the winner was to tribute to their father Gorbak. He ends up losing the fight after hanging from a cliff while Durak tries to help him up. Goro betrays his brother and knocks him into the pit.

Goro was originally meant to appear in Mortal Kombat: Legacy season 2 and then in the ultimately cancelled season 3.

Goro appears in the direct-to-video animated film Mortal Kombat Legends: Scorpion's Revenge, a retelling of the first game in the series where Goro is again depicted as the defending champion, voiced again by Richardson.

Goro appears in the 2021 film Mortal Kombat voiced by Angus Sampson.

Other appearances
He made a guest appearance the 2018 film Ready Player One.
Goro appeared in the RoosterTeeth animated web series Death Battle, fighting against Machamp from the Pokémon franchise. In it, Goro held the advantage in experience and presumed punching speeds but ultimately lost against Machamp's skill, moveset and vastly superior strength and toughness.

Reception
Goro was awarded the titles of Best Villain in the 1993 Nintendo Power Awards ("best, worst and biggest bad boy of them all") and the Hottest Gaming Hunk of 1993 by Electronic Gaming Monthly. His role in the Mortal Kombat games have been well-received; Techtree stated that while Goro was not the main boss from the first game, he was probably the hardest boss. GameSpot praised Goro's moves in Mortal Kombat 4 as in contrast to the game's boss, Shinnok, he is harder to defeat. According to GameSpot, the fight against Goro in Mortal Kombat: Shaolin Monks was however very easy to win, in contrast to other boss fights from the same game.

He was ranked  No. 20 in "The 47 Most Diabolical Video-Game Villains of All Time" poll by GamePro in 2008, and  No. 67 in the list of "Top 100 Videogame Villains" by IGN. UGO.com featured him in their "Top 11 Mortal Kombat Characters" list, with comments focused on his appearance due to the "twist" his first appearance gave since he was very different from the other characters. UGO also ranked him as the 15th hardest boss in video games. GameSpot's list of the "Top Ten Boss Fights" featured Goro due to how difficult it was to defeat him in Mortal Kombat, with a note that despite the introductions of bosses similar to Goro in sequels, Goro still remained the "grand champion". Goro was featured in Uneality's "Six Memorable Boss Fights in Video Games", who commented that he was scary and that one felt helpless against those four arms. GamePlayBook listed Goro as the seventh best Mortal Kombat character, who commented that he was still awesome after all these years and praised his grab-and-pound move and charging punches. Cheat Code Central ranked Goro as the fourth best Mortal Kombat character, who commented that "Midway completely outdid themselves" with his implementation in the first MK game. In UGO Networks' 2012 list of top Mortal Kombat characters, Goro placed 22nd.

His addition to the GameCube port of Mortal Kombat: Deception received positive response by Greg Kasavin of GameSpot; he claimed Goro and Shao Khan fit well within Deception despite looking "anemic". GameSpy's Miguel Lopez described Goro as a "legendary villain" but at the same criticized his physical appearance from Deception as his "anatomical proportions seem a little off". IGN listed him as a character they would like to see as downloadable content for Mortal Kombat vs. DC Universe, noting "Goro was the real challenge" of the first Mortal Kombat title although Shang Tsung was the final boss from such game, adding that "MK is all about visceral thrills, and it doesn't get more visceral than bludgeoning your enemies to death with four giant, muscular arms".

In a 1994 article by Business Week, the film version of Goro was described as "the most advanced mechanical creature H[o]llywood has ever made". When the release of a third Mortal Kombat live-action film was announced, IGN listed him as a character they wanted to see fighting in the film, but made with CGI technology as opposed to the practical effects used in the first movie.

Notes

References

Action film characters
Extraterrestrial characters in video games
Male film villains
Fictional henchmen in video games
Fictional hybrid life forms
Male characters in video games
Mortal Kombat characters
Prince characters in video games
Video game antagonists
Video game bosses
Video game characters introduced in 1992
Video game characters with superhuman strength